Maria Fidelis Catholic School FCJ is a Roman Catholic co-educational secondary school in the London Borough of Camden, England. It was founded by the Faithful Companions of Jesus.

History
The school was founded in 1830 by the Faithful Companions of Jesus, or more specifically, their founder, Marie-Madeleine d'Houët. Just months after the school's opening, Marie later realised she could not keep running the school and passed the role of headteacher to Julie Guillemet, a friend of hers and FCJ sister.

It was at first an industrial school financed by charitable appeals. The school then progressed to being a convent boarding school and then to a selective non-fee paying grammar school known as St. Aloysius.

The school then became a comprehensive in 1974 with the merger of St. Aloysius with St. Vincent's Schools which was run by the Sisters of Charity. The name Maria Fidelis was chosen by the Sisters meaning Mary Most Faithful.

Maria Fidelis today stands on Drummond Crescent in the Somers Town area of Camden, near Euston.

The school won BBC's 'School Choir Of The Year' and are known for their vocal arrangements under the direction of Karen Gibson. The choir performed for Pope Benedict XVI at The Big Assembly at St Mary's University College, Twickenham on  during his visit to the UK.

Since , the school admits boys as well as girls, in co-education.

Houses
The school has four primary houses in which students are randomly sorted into. These houses also have colours, which they are more commonly identified by.

 D'Houet; blue (named after the founder of the Faithful Companions of Jesus, Marie-Madeleine d'Houët)
 Guillemet; green (named after the first headmistress of the school, Julie Guillemet, a member of the Faithful Companions of Jesus)
 Faber; yellow
 Loyola; red (named after St. Ignatius of Loyola)

Current Building
The High Speed 2 rail network's planned route was to go through North Gower Street, the location of the school's previous building. This meant the school was required to move locations to Drummond Crescent, nearby to Euston Road.

While the school was rebuilt due to HS2 works, it is more likely that there was a greater reason for this. For example the British Government's Building Schools for the Future programme, which consisted of the redesign and rebuild of multiple educational institutions.

Arguably, Maria Fidelis benefited from this move as it was closer to popular locations the British Library, the Francis Crick Institute, the Wellcome Trust, UCL, SOAS University, LSE and Central Saint Martin's School Of Art, enabling better school trips to popular locations, and potential internship experience.

Notable alumni
Kathy Burke (born 1964), comedian, actress and theatre director
Roisin Conaty (born 1979), comedian and actress
Brooke Kinsella (born 1982), actress
Jane Wymark, actress, Midsomer Murders

References

External links
Official website
Ofsted inspection reports

Secondary schools in the London Borough of Camden
Girls' schools in London
Catholic secondary schools in the Archdiocese of Westminster
Educational institutions established in 1830
1830 establishments in England
Voluntary aided schools in London